Strontiofluorite is a halide mineral that contains the alkali earth metal strontium and the halogen fluorine, a form of strontium fluoride. It can be considered a strontium-analogue of fluorite, which contains calcium as the dominant cation instead.

It is translucent and pale gray in colour.

It appears as cubo-octahedral crystals up to a size of 0.5 mm.

It is found in association with astrophyllite, burbankite, chlorbartonite, fluorapatite, fluorite, lamprophyllite, polezhaevaite-(Ce) and villiaumite.

References 

Strontium minerals
Fluorine minerals